Nagercoil division is a revenue division in the Kanyakumari district of Tamil Nadu, India.

References 
 

Kanyakumari district